Dundalk Greyhound Stadium also known as the Ramparts was a greyhound racing stadium off Rampart Lane on Townparks, Dundalk, County Louth, Ireland.

Opening 
Racing started on 29 October 1930 just eleven days after the Dundalk greyhound racing company was formed. The venue was called the Ramparts and was found east of central Dundalk, south of Rampart Lane. Paddy Martin was the founding director and also acted as Racing Manager at the track.

History
Paddy Martin's brother Jimmy took over the reins as Racing Manager in 1957 and later the Dundealgan Greyhound Racing Co decided to introduce a major event to the track in an attempt to attract the open race stars. That event was the Dundalk International and the excellent prize money ensured that entries from the United Kingdom were also received. The first running was in 1968 and won by Not Flashing. The list of winners included many famous greyhounds that included Time Up Please, Ivy Hall Flash, Mutts Silver and Nameless Pixie.

The stadium benefited from considerable investment in 1968 resulting in a new glass fronted grandstand, tote facilities and increased terracing, at the cost of £100,000.

In 1973 the Irish Greyhound Derby sponsors PJ Carroll Ltd offered a huge single race prize of £1,200 for the event which was won by Bashful Man.

During the 1980s and 1990s the stars continued to grace the track, Rapid Mover, Cooladine Super, Hit the Lid, Adraville Bridge and Farloe Melody (twice) all won the prestigious race.

The track required a facelift and in the early 1990s the situation was addressed. The greyhound management of Jim Martin Jr., Gerry Kerley and Hugh McGahan met with the horse racing management who were also experiencing tough times and they discussed the idea of a merger in late 1996. In 1999 the Dundalk Race Company PLC and Dundealgan Greyhound Racing Company Limited merged to form Dundalk Racing (1999) Ltd. This would allow a new horse racing circuit to be built over the existing turf course and a greyhound track inside the main course.

Closure
The Ramparts was closed on 20 November 2000 during which time the horse racecourse was undergoing major changes. The site today is covered partly by an Aldi and builders merchant next to the Marshes Shopping Centre.

Competitions
Dundalk International

Track records

References

1930 establishments in Ireland
2000 disestablishments in Ireland
Defunct greyhound racing venues in Ireland
Sports venues in County Louth
Sport in County Louth
Sport in Dundalk